Manuel Becerra (1762 – ) was a Tejano settler and politician in Texas. In the 1820s, he served as the first secretary of the town of La Bahia (today Goliad, Texas) and accompanied Stephen F. Austin's travel to the Colorado River to find a place for a colony. In 1827, he served as síndico (civil judge or syndic) in Martín De León's Guadalupe colony and helped negotiate a treaty with the Karankawa tribe.

Historical Marker
The marker was commissioned and placed by his descendant Estella Zermeño.

References

1762 births
1849 deaths
People from Goliad, Texas
Texas politicians